
Gmina Gorlice is a rural gmina (administrative district) in Gorlice County, Lesser Poland Voivodeship, in southern Poland. Its seat is the town of Gorlice, although the town is not part of the territory of the gmina.

Villages
Gmina Gorlice contains the villages and settlements of Bielanka, Bystra, Dominikowice, Klęczany, Kobylanka, Kwiatonowice, Stróżówka, Szymbark and Zagórzany.

Neighbouring gminas
Gmina Gorlice is bordered by the town of Gorlice and by the gminas of Biecz, Grybów, Lipinki, Łużna, Moszczenica, Ropa, Sękowa and Uście Gorlickie.

References
 Polish official population figures 2006

Gorlice
Gorlice County
Bilingual communes in Poland